This is a list of members of the Victorian Legislative Council between 1943 and 1946. As half of the Legislative Council's terms expired at each triennial election, half of these members were elected at the 1940 triennial election with terms expiring in 1946, while the other half were elected at the 1943 triennial election with terms expiring in 1949.

 On 28 July 1943, Arthur Disney, Labor MLC for Melbourne West Province, died. Labor candidate Les Coleman won the resulting by-election in October 1943.
 On 31 July 1943, James Miller Balfour, Country MLC for Gippsland Province, died. Unendorsed Country candidate Trevor Harvey won the resulting by-election in October 1943.

Sources
 Re-member (a database of all Victorian MPs since 1851). Parliament of Victoria.
 Victorian Year Book 1943–44

Members of the Parliament of Victoria by term
20th-century Australian politicians